The Riegelsberg Transmitter (or Schocksberg Transmitter) is a transmitter for FM and TV at Riegelsberg, near Saarbrücken, Germany. The transmitter uses as aerial a  guyed mast.

See also
 List of Masts

External links
 
 http://www.skyscraperpage.com/diagrams/?b46680
 https://theantennasite.com/archive/germany-riegelsberg-amsender-pictures.html

Buildings and structures in Saarbrücken (district)